Out of the Wreck is a surviving 1917 American drama silent film directed by William Desmond Taylor and written by Maude Erve Corsan and Gardner Hunting. The film stars Kathlyn Williams, William Clifford, William Conklin, Stella LeSaint, William Jefferson and Don Bailey. The film was released on March 8, 1917, by Paramount Pictures.

Plot

Cast 
Kathlyn Williams as Agnes Aldrich
William Clifford as Steve O'Brien
William Conklin as James Aldrich
Stella LeSaint as Ruby Sheldon
William Jefferson (actor) as Howard Duncan
Don Bailey as Tom Ryan

Preservation status
The film is preserved in the Library of Congress collections.

References

External links 
 

1917 films
1910s English-language films
Silent American drama films
1917 drama films
Paramount Pictures films
Films directed by William Desmond Taylor
American black-and-white films
American silent feature films
1910s American films